Maximum Medical Improvement (MMI) occurs when an injured employee reaches a state where their condition cannot be improved any further or when a treatment plateau in a person’s healing process is reached. It can mean that the patient has fully recovered from the injury or that the patient’s medical condition has stabilized to the point that no major medical or emotional change can be expected in the injured workers’ condition.  At that point, no further healing or improvement is deemed possible and this occurs despite continuing medical treatment or rehabilitative programs the injured worker partakes in. When a worker who is receiving Workers' Compensation benefits reaches maximum medical improvement, his or her condition is assessed and a degree of permanent or partial impairment is determined. This degree will impact the amount of benefits the worker is able to receive.

Maximum medical improvement means that treatment options have been exhausted. Temporary disability payments are terminated and a settlement is worked out regarding the condition of the worker at this point.

External links
 Workerscompensation.com, Worker's Compensation resource website

Labour law
Health insurance